The Walking Dead is an EP by the American doom metal band Saint Vitus, released in 1985 through SST Records. This is the last release to feature original singer Scott Reagers, until he returned for Die Healing (1995). The EP was released on 12" vinyl in 1985, but there was no CD release until 2010. In that format, it was typically included with the band's 1985 LP, Hallow's Victim.

Track listing
 "Darkness" - 3:26
 "White Stallions" - 5:24
 "The Walking Dead" - 11:32

Personnel

Saint Vitus
 Scott Reagers - vocals
 Dave Chandler - guitar
 Mark Adams - bass
 Armando Acosta - drums

Production
Joe Carducci - producer
SPOT - producer, engineer

References

1985 EPs
Saint Vitus (band) albums
SST Records EPs
Albums produced by Spot (producer)